Max Riemelt (born 7 January 1984) is a German actor, known internationally for playing Wolfgang Bogdanow in the Netflix series Sense8. In Germany, he is known for many years of television and cinema both acting and directing.

Career 
Riemelt's career began in Germany at the age of 13, in the TV productions Eine Familie zum Küssen and Praxis Bülowbogen. The following year Riemelt played his first leading role in the ZDF Christmas series Zwei allein (director: Matthias Steurer): the Waisenkind "Max Loser". In the video for the title song "Two of a Kind" by the Hamburg duo "R & B", Riemelt has a cameo appearance.

He has starred in all of Dennis Gansel's feature films, starting with Mädchen, Mädchen. In 2013, he starred in the movie Free Fall with Hanno Koffler, in which he plays Kay Engel, a police officer in training. The movie depicts a gay love story and has been compared to Brokeback Mountain.

From 2015 to 2018, he starred in The Wachowskis' Netflix series Sense8, playing Wolfgang Bogdanow, a German safe cracker. The first season received positive reviews from critics. 

He starred in the psychological thriller Berlin Syndrome alongside Australian actress Teresa Palmer, which premiered at the Sundance Film Festival in 2017. The film received generally favorable reviews, and both Palmer and Riemelt garnered praise for their performances.

In 2020, he joined the cast of The Matrix Resurrections.

Personal life 
Riemelt has a daughter. He is a passionate speaker for equality.

Filmography

TV

Awards 
2004: Best Actor for Before the Fall (Karlovy Vary International Film Festival)

References

Further reading

External links 

 

1984 births
Living people
Male actors from Berlin
German male television actors
German male film actors
20th-century German male actors